The Greater Pibor Administrative Area is an administrative area in South Sudan.

History
From the beginning of South Sudanese independence, the Anyuak, Jie, Kachepo, and Murle people in Jonglei sought greater autonomy from the Jonglei State government dominated by Nuer and Dinka. The resulting armed insurrections against the Government of South Sudan GoSS, initially dispersed, coalesced into the South Sudan Democratic Movement/Army (SSDM/A), which in turn was ultimately dominated by David Yau Yau and his Cobra Faction. Peace negotiations in the spring of 2014 led to a compromise that carved out two counties of Pibor and Pochalla within Jonglei state to create the new semi-autonomous Greater Pibor Administrative Area (GPAA).

The special administrative area was dissolved after the creation of Boma State in 2015.

As a result of a peace agreement signed in February 2020, Boma State was dissolved and Pibor was reconstituted as a special administrative area.

Towns and cities
The capital of the state is Pibor. The population of Pibor was estimated at less than 1,000 people in 2005. The town of Pochalla in Pochalla County lies directly on the border with Ethiopia. The town is about 470 kilometers (290 miles) from Juba via road.

Chief Administrators

References

2014 establishments in South Sudan
Pibor Administrative Area